National Liberation Front may refer to:

As a full name
 National Liberation Front (Algeria) (FLN), Group that fought for Algerian independence 
 National Liberation Front of Angola (FNLA), Group that fought for Angolan independence 
 National Liberation Front – Bahrain (NLF), Marxist Leninist Party in Bahrain 
 National Liberation Front (Burundi) (FROLINA), Hutu Political Party 
 National Liberation Front of Corsica (FLNC), Corsican Nationalist Militant Group
 National Liberation Front (Greece) (EAM), Greek Resistance Movement against Axis occupation
 National Liberation Front (Jammu Kashmir) (NLF)
 National Liberation Front (Macedonia) (NOF), Militant group participating in the Greek Civil War
 National Liberation Front (Peru) (FLN), Peruvian political party
 National Liberation Front (South Africa) (NLF), co-founded by Neville Alexander
 National Liberation Front of Tripura (NLFT) (India)
 National Liberation Front of Venezuela (NLFV) (Venezuela)
 National Liberation Front (Sri Lanka) (NLF)
 National Liberation Front for South Vietnam (NLFSV), also called "Viet Cong".
 National Liberation Front (South Yemen) (NLF)

As part of a name

 Farabundo Martí National Liberation Front (FMLN) (El Salvador)
 Gorkha National Liberation Front (GNLF) (Nepal)
 Kanak and Socialist National Liberation Front (FLNKS) (New Caledonia)
 Karbi Longri N.C. Hills Liberation Front (KLNLF) (India)
 Khmer People's National Liberation Front (KPNLF)
 Kurdistan Workers' Party, or National Liberation Front of Kurdistan (ENRK) -- military wing of PKK
 Liberation Front of the Slovene Nation (Slovenia)
 Moro National Liberation Front (MNLF) (Philippines)
 National Liberation Movement (Albania), or Albanian National Liberation Front (NLF)
 Ogaden National Liberation Front (ONLF) (Ethiopia)
 Sandinista National Liberation Front (FSLN) (Nicaragua)
 Uganda National Liberation Front (UNLF)
 Unitary National Liberation Front, or People's Liberation Front (Yugoslavia)
 United National Liberation Front (UNLF) (India)
 National Front for Liberation (Syria)

See also 
 National Liberation Army (disambiguation)
 National Liberation Movement (disambiguation)
 Wars of national liberation